The Dean of Derry is based at St Columb's Cathedral, Derry in the Diocese of Derry and Raphoe in the Church of Ireland.

The current Dean of Derry is Raymond Stewart. He was appointed to the cathedral in December 2016 and inaugurated on 28 March 2017 by the Bishop of Derry and Raphoe, Kenneth Good.

Stewart succeeded William Morton who served as Dean of Derry for almost 20 years and then took on role as Dean of St Patricks Cathedral in Dublin in September 2016.

Deans of Derry

 1611/2 William Webbe 
 1621–1635 Henry Sutton (afterwards Dean of Limerick, 1635) 
 1635–1637 Michael Wandesford
 1637/8–1639 James Margetson (afterwards Dean of Christ Church Cathedral, Dublin, 1639) 
 1639/40 Geoffrey Rhodes 
 1661 George Beaumont
 1663 George Holland 
 1670–1671 William Lightburne 
 1671/2 John Lesley 
 1672 Peter Manby (converted to Roman Catholic but remained dean) 
 1690–1690 Peter Morris 
 1690/1–1695 Thomas Wallis 
 1695–1699/1700 Coote Ormsby 
 1699/1700–1724 John Bolton 
 1724–1733 George Berkeley (philosopher) (afterwards Bishop of Cloyne, 1734) 
 1733/4–1740 George Stone (afterwards Bishop of Ferns and Leighlin, 1740) 
 1740–1744 Robert Downes (afterwards Bishop of Ferns and Leighlin, 1744) 
 1744–1752 Arthur Smyth (afterwards Bishop of Clonfert and Kilmacduagh, 1752) 
 1752–1769 Rt Hon Philip Sydney Smyth (4th Viscount Strangford, afterwards archdeacon) 
 1769–1780 Thomas Barnard (afterwards Bishop of Killaloe and Kilfenora, 1780) 
 1780–1781 William Cecil Pery (afterwards Bishop of Killala and Achonry
 1781–1783 Edward Emily 
 1783–1808 John Hume 
 1818–1819 James Saurin (afterwards Bishop of Dromore, 1819) 
 1820–1860 Thomas Bunbury Gough 
 1860–1874 Hugh Usher Tighe
 1874–1882 Charles Seymour
 1882–1883 John Gwynne
 1883–1897 Andrew Ferguson Smyly
 1897–1901 Thomas Olphert
 1901–1911 George Galbraith
 1911–1921 Richard Hayes
 1921–1946 Richard George Salmon King
 1946-1967 Leslie Robert Lawrenson
 1967–1984 George Good
 1984–1997 David Cecil Orr
 1997–2016. William W Morton
 2017- Raymond J Stewart

References

 
Diocese of Derry and Raphoe
Dean of Derry